Five athletes (three men and two women) from Puerto Rico competed at the 1996 Summer Paralympics in Atlanta, United States.

See also
Puerto Rico at the Paralympics
Puerto Rico at the 1996 Summer Olympics

References 

Nations at the 1996 Summer Paralympics
1996
Summer Paralympics